was a Japanese professional sumo wrestler from Mikasa, Hokkaido. His highest rank was ōzeki. He was a member of the Tomozuna and Takasago stable.

Career
He was born  in Mikasa, Sorachi District, Hokkaido, the second son of a miner. In the summer of 1912 in Sapporo he met yokozuna Tachiyama, who recruited him to Tomozuna stable. He made his professional debut in January 1913. Despite his short height he was extremely flexible, able to throw his opponents with both his right hand grip and left hand grip. He was transferred to Takasago stable in May 1919 when his stablemaster Tachiyama (by then going by the elder name Azumazeki) abruptly quit the sumo world. He was diligent about training and reached the top makuuchi division in January 1921. In May 1922 he won his first (and only) kinboshi by defeating Ōnishiki Uichirō, who had not lost a bout in two years and had also defeated Tachiyama in the latter's last ever bout in January 1917. This in fact turned out to be Ōnishiki's last bout as well, as he quit sumo in the wake of the strike against the Tokyo Sumo Association known as the Mikawajima-Incident. Following this performance Tachihikari was promoted to sekiwake in January 1923 and to ōzeki in May 1923, ahead of the more favoured . He was the first ōzeki of the newly established Japan Sumo Association, formed from a merger of the Tokyo and Osaka associations. Although he did not win any championships at the ōzeki rank he continued to have good results until he hurt his right leg in a match against  in May 1926. In the four tournaments following that injury he only took part in three bouts, and he finally retired in October 1927 having lost his ōzeki rank.

Retirement from sumo
He became a toshiyori or elder of the Japan Sumo Association under the name Naruto Oyakata, affiliated to Takasago stable. In 1937 he took part the kanreki dohyo-iri ceremony to mark Tachiyama's 60th birthday, in the role of sword-bearer. In May 1951 he quit the Sumo Association following disagreements with Takasago's stablemaster, ex-Maedayama, that saw him transfer briefly to Tatsunami stable. He returned to his hometown to start full-time operations of a restaurant that he had begun in Otaru. He died in May 1952 at the age of 55.

Career record

See also
Glossary of sumo terms
List of ōzeki

References

1897 births
1952 deaths
Japanese sumo wrestlers
Ōzeki
Sumo people from Hokkaido